Arthur Edward Joseph Gagné (October 12, 1896 – October 5, 1988) was a Canadian ice hockey forward, born in Ottawa.

Career
Art Gagné started out his career in the Ottawa City Hockey League, where he played for various teams between 1914–1917. He then played three seasons in Quebec for Laval University, Quebec Sons of Ireland and Quebec Montagnais.

Gagné joined the Edmonton Eskimos of the Albertan Big-4 League in 1920–21, where he had a productive partnership with centre forward Duke Keats, also when the team moved along to the Western Canada Hockey League. In 1926, he moved to the Montreal Canadiens of the National Hockey League. He also played with the Regina Capitals, Boston Bruins, Ottawa Senators, and Detroit Falcons. Gagné scored 100 points in his 228-game NHL career.

Career statistics

References

External links

Art Gagne at JustSportsStats

1896 births
1988 deaths
Boston Bruins players
Canadian ice hockey forwards
Detroit Red Wings players
Edmonton Eskimos (ice hockey) players
Ice hockey people from Ottawa
Montreal Canadiens players
Ottawa Senators (1917) players
Ottawa Senators (original) players
Regina Capitals players
Seattle Seahawks (ice hockey) players